Kungälvs IK is an ice-hockey club in Sweden. They play in the fourth tier of Swedish ice hockey, Division 2.

Roster
updated November 27, 2013Team website

Season-by-season record
record since 1998-99

References

External links
 Kungälvs IK webpage (in Swedish)
 Eliteprospects.com entry on Kungälvs IK

Ice hockey teams in Sweden
Ice hockey teams in Västra Götaland County